Guan Gong is a Taiwanese television series based on the life of Guan Yu and parts of the 14th century historical novel Romance of the Three Kingdoms by Luo Guanzhong, while incorporating some elements of fantasy and Chinese mythology as well. The series was first broadcast in Taiwan on CTS from 31 July to 15 October in 1996.

Cast

 Kou Fung as Guan Yu / Dragon King of the South Sea
 Chen Chun-sheng as young Guan Yu
 Tsui Hao-jan as Zhang Fei
 Chang Fu-chien as Liu Bei
 Lung Lung as Cao Cao
 Sung Ta-min as Lü Bu
 Lung Kuan-wu as Ding Yuan
 Irene Chiu Yu-Ting as Diaochan
 Chang Feng as Sima Hui
 Chao Shu-hai as Zhuge Liang
 Hsieh Tsu-wu as Zhao Yun
 Mini Kung as Huang Yueying
 Sze Yu as Lu Su
 Yang Chun as Dong Zhuo
 Wei Tzu-yun as Sun Ce
 Lee Hsing-wen as Sun Quan
 Chin Fung as Zhou Yu
 Esther Kwan as Sun Shangxiang
 Tsui Pei-yi as Daqiao
 Yueh Ling as Xiaoqiao
 Yang Chung-en as Lu Xun
 Ou-yang Lung as Hua Tuo
 Wang Miyuki as Sang Xiaodie
 Ku Kuan-chung as Yuan Shao
 Alyssa Chia as Wen Xiu
 Wang Hao as Lü Yu
 Vicky Chen as Xiaoying
 Huang Chung-yu as Hua Xiong / Zhang Liao
 Lu Fung as Zhou Cang
 Hsia Ching-ting as Yu Ji
 Kuang Ming-chieh as Xiahou Ying
 Li Luo as Kong Xiu
 Huang Ying-hsun as Guan Ping
 Mayko Chen as Guan Yan
 Chiang Hsia as Guan Yu's mother
  as Lady Gan
 Mei Chang-fen as Lady Mi
 Yu Ke-hsin as Lady Bian
 Shao Pei-yu as Holy Mother

See also
 List of media adaptations of Romance of the Three Kingdoms

External links
 

1996 Taiwanese television series debuts
1996 Taiwanese television series endings
Taiwanese television series
Television series set in the Eastern Han dynasty
Works based on Romance of the Three Kingdoms
1990s Taiwanese television series